Live and Sweaty was an Australian sports television program, broadcast on the ABC from 1991 until 1994. Hosted by Andrew Denton (and later Elle McFeast), the show was part panel-based, part talk show and part comedy, and predated The Footy Show which has a similar format.

Live and Sweaty regulars
Andrew Denton was the show's host, and this was Denton's third series for the ABC (after Blah Blah Blah and The Money or the Gun). Comedian Libbi Gorr (in her Elle McFeast persona) was a roving reporter, panellist and eventual host of the show when Denton left in 1993.

Other regular panel members were actor Lex "The Swine" Marinos (always introduced with a Zorba the Greek style musical theme), Triple J presenter Debbie "Skull of Rust" Spillane, former NRL player Rex "The Moose" Mossop, and Peter "Crackers" Keenan. A sports news segment was presented by ABC sportscaster Karen Tighe.

Notable stunts
In 1992, Denton challenged the Prime Minister of Australia, Paul Keating, to a game of ten-pin bowling. Keating made no comment, but Denton continued to up the ante over the course of the year, protesting outside Parliament House and organising petitions urging the Prime Minister to accept the challenge. Keating eventually relented, not to the game, but appeared in a live interview with Denton.

In the lead up to the 1992 Summer Olympics, Denton and the rest of the regular cast of the show recorded the song "I Don't Care As Long As We Beat New Zealand" parodying the sporting rivalry between Australia and New Zealand. It was released as a single and reached #38 on the Australian charts.

Discography

Singles

Awards and nominations

ARIA Music Awards
The ARIA Music Awards are a set of annual ceremonies presented by Australian Recording Industry Association (ARIA), which recognise excellence, innovation, and achievement across all genres of the music of Australia. They commenced in 1987.

! 
|-
| rowspan="2"| 1993 || "I Don't Care As Long As We Beat New Zealand"|| ARIA Award for Best Comedy Release ||  || 
|-

See also

List of Australian television series

References

External links

Australian sports television series
Australian Broadcasting Corporation original programming
1991 Australian television series debuts
1994 Australian television series endings